Anila Sreekumar is an Indian actress working in Malayalam films and television.
She started her acting career in 1992, made her debut with a Malayalam movie Sargam and later went on to act in several television serials such as Deepangal chuttum, Draupadi, Jwalayayi, Sooryaputhri and Chinna Thambi.

Personal life
Anila was born to Peethambaran and Padmavathi in Chevayur, Kozhikode. She has a younger brother Anoop. She is married to Production controller and producer Sreekumar and has 2 children Abhinav and Adhilekshmi.

She is a professional dancer and is a student of Kalamandalam Kshemavathy and Saraswathy. She runs a dance school and an event management company.

Filmography

Television career

Television serials (partial)

Reality Shows

TV shows as guest
 Ivide Ingannanu Bhai (Mazahvil Manorama)
 Kootukari (DD Malayalam)
 Ormakal Marikkumo (DD Malayalam)
 Annie's Kitchen (Amrita TV)
 Malayali Darbar (Amrita TV)
 Onnum Onnum Moonu (Mazahvil Manorama)
 Kudumbasametham (ACV)
 Manassinoru Mazhavillu (Kairali TV)
 Adukkaliyil Ninnu Arangathekku (Kairali TV) 
 Christmas Dishes (Kaumudy TV)
 Amma Ammayiyamma (Kairali TV)
 Ningalkkariyamo (Surya TV)
 Sarigama (Asianet)
 Surya Singer (Kairali TV)
 Valkkannadi (Asianet)
 Nammal Thammil (Asianet)
 Manam Pole Mangalyam (Jaihind TV)
Smart show (Flowers TV)

Music albums
 Nilayil Neeradi
 Chaithrasundari
 Karyasiddhi Pooja
 Amme Narayana
Chandanam Kumkumam Chudala Bhasmarchitham
Nandhi Orayiram Nandhi

Drama
 Shoorpanaka

Awards and nominations
1998: Nana Best actress (Thamarakuzhali)
1999: Kerala State Television Award for Best Actress (Draupadi)
2000: Kerala film critics awards (Gandharayamam)
2003: Kerala film critics awards (Jwalayayi)
2010: Kerala film audience council award (Parayi petta Pathirukulam)
2016: Nominated: Flowers TV Awards Best Supporting Actress (Krishnathulasi)
2018: Vijay Television Awards for Best Mother (Chinna Thambi)
2019: Vijay Television Awards for Best Mamiyar-Fiction

References

Indian actresses
Living people
1970 births
Actresses in Malayalam cinema
Actresses in Malayalam television
Actresses in Tamil television
Actresses in Telugu television
Indian voice actresses